Bulgarian-Croatian relations are foreign relations between Bulgaria and Croatia. Both countries established diplomatic relations on August 13, 1992.  Bulgaria has had an embassy in Zagreb since 1994. Croatia has had an embassy in Sofia since 1992.

History 
In the 9th and 10th centuries, when Bulgaria and Croatia shared a border, the two countries fought in the Croatian–Bulgarian wars. In the Middle Ages, there was commerce between the Bulgarian Empire and the Republic of Ragusa.

In the late 19th and early 20th century, there were strong Bulgarian-Croatian relations in politics, culture, education and sport. Stjepan Radić, one of the most prominent Croatian politicians of the era, wrote in his 1917 book that of all Slavs, Bulgarians were closest to Croats. Bulgarian-Croatian relations suffered in the pre-World War II Yugoslav state (1918–1941), ruled by the Karađorđević dynasty, due to earlier conflicts between Bulgaria and Serbia.

The Kingdom of Bulgaria was one of the first countries to recognize the Independent State of Croatia. The Bulgarian embassy in Zagreb operated from 1941 to 1944. The Croatian Embassy in Sofia operated from 1941 to 1944.

For the rest of the period prior to 1992, there had been no special crisis or event that required bilateral diplomacy from Croatians and Bulgarians as self-representing nations. However, as two South Slavic nations in relatively close proximity, both nations have been party to some form of diplomatic mission throughout the centuries, whether between the Ottoman Empire and the Republic of Venice (which controlled Croatia's coastal region for some centuries), or during the 20th century when Croatia had been part of Yugoslavia and various attempts were made from within Yugoslavia and Bulgaria to incorporate Bulgaria into the Pan-South Slavic nation.

Diplomacy

Republic of Bulgaria
Zagreb (Embassy)

Republic of Croatia
Sofia (Embassy)

See also 
 Foreign relations of Bulgaria
 Foreign relations of Croatia
 Bulgarians in Croatia
 Bulgaria–Yugoslavia relations

References

Sources

External links
  Bulgarian embassy in Zagreb

 
Croatia
Bilateral relations of Croatia